Rhinella henseli is a species of toad in the family Bufonidae that is endemic to Brazil. Its natural habitats are subtropical or tropical moist lowland forests, rivers, and intermittent freshwater marshes. It is threatened by habitat loss.

References

Sources

henseli
Amphibians of Brazil
Amphibians described in 1934
Endemic fauna of Brazil
Taxonomy articles created by Polbot